The women's taijiquan / taijijian all-around competition at the 2008 Beijing Wushu Tournament was held from August 22 to 23 at the Olympic Sports Center Gymnasium.

Schedule 
All times are Beijing Time (UTC+08:00)

Results 
The taijiquan event was judged with the degree of difficulty component while the taijijian event was judged without it.

References 

Women's_taijiquan